Robert "Bobby" Buckle (17 October 1868 – April 1959) was one of eleven schoolboys who founded the Hotspur Football Club in 1882 later to become Tottenham Hotspur Football Club.

Career
Buckle was born on 17 October 1868 to parents William and Emma Ebenezer at 5 Penshurst Road (originally called Stanford Street) just off of White Hart Lane in Tottenham. Buckle was one of the founding members of Hotspur, who was also elected the first-ever captain of the club at its inception, just seven weeks before his 14th birthday. He was featured in the club's first known line-up and is Tottenham's first recorded goalscorer on 20 October 1883.

He served in varying capacities and being involved in many of the red letter events of the club's early history. He served on the committee from 1884, was appointed honorary secretary and treasurer in 1890 and was elected to the first board of directors in 1898.

Just two years later, at the turn of the century in 1900, Buckle resigned from the board after overseeing the adoption of professional status, the formation of the Limited Company and the move to White Hart Lane.

During his Tottenham career between the years of 1882 and 1895 he has a recorded 25 goals in 53 appearances although it is likely that this number is higher with unrecorded games taken into consideration.

As work began on the Northumberland Development Project to build Tottenham Hotspur a new ground in 2017, a group of fans began campaigning for a blue plaque to be mounted on the house in White Hart Lane where Buckle lived when he helped found the club and which became its first postal address.

Further reading

References

External links
 Bobby Buckle

1868 births
1959 deaths
English footballers
Footballers from Tottenham
Tottenham Hotspur F.C. players
Association football wingers